Churchville is a village in Monroe County, New York, United States. According to the 2010 census, the population was 1,961. The village is named after Samuel Church, an early settler.

The Village of Churchville is west of the City of Rochester in the north part of the Town of Riga. It is at the intersection of Routes 33 and 36, north of Interstate 490.

Churchville Park and golf course are north of the village near Hutton Circle and Kendall Road.

History
In 1806, Samuel Church purchased the land that would become Churchville in what was known as West Pulteney. The village was incorporated on September 21, 1852 and named after Samuel Church, who owned all the land within the village limits.

Geography
Churchville is at  (43.105462, -77.880533).

Demographics

As of the census of 2000, the village had 1,887 people, 723 households, and 514 families. The population density was 1,662.7 people per square mile (644.8/km2). There were 753 housing units at an average density of 663.5 per square mile (257.3/km2). The village's racial makeup was 96.34% White, 0.74% African American, 0.11% Native American, 0.90% Asian, 0.05% from other races, and 1.85% from two or more races. Hispanic or Latino of any race were 0.42% of the population.

There were 723 households, out of which 36.9% had children under the age of 18 living with them, 58.5% were married couples living together, 9.7% had a female householder with no husband present, and 28.8% were non-families. 24.8% of all households were made up of individuals, and 10.7% had someone living alone who was 65 years of age or older. The average household size was 2.59 and the average family size was 3.10.

In the village, the population was spread out, with 27.6% under the age of 18, 6.6% from 18 to 24, 31.9% from 25 to 44, 22.8% from 45 to 64, and 11.0% who were 65 years of age or older. The median age was 36 years. For every 100 females, there were 90.8 males. For every 100 females age 18 and over, there were 85.1 males.

The village's median household income was $55,357, and the family median income was $63,333. Males had a median income of $45,667 versus $31,563 for females. The village's per capita income was $23,190. About 2.8% of families and 4.2% of the population were below the poverty line, including 3.0% of those under age 18 and 10.7% of those age 65 or over.

Education
Churchville is served by the Churchville-Chili Central School District.

Government

The village is governed by Mayor John T. Hartman and four trustees: Michael Brown, Scott Cullen, Julie Michalko, Diane Pusateri.

Noted residents
Charles S. Baker - former US Congressman.
Brian Cyr - Canadian professional darts player
Renée Fleming - opera performer.
Tim Redding - Former pitcher in Major League Baseball and graduate of Churchville Chili Senior High School.
Jenn Suhr - An Olympic gold medalist in pole vaulting.
Coretti Arle-Titz - singer
Lyndsay Wall - Women's ice hockey player, Olympics silver and bronze medal winner.
Frances Willard - women's rights and temperance leader.
Floyd R. Newman – oil man

References

External links

 History link of Churchville, New York
 

Villages in New York (state)
Rochester metropolitan area, New York
Villages in Monroe County, New York
1855 establishments in New York (state)
Populated places established in 1855